Sogong-dong is a dong, neighbourhood of Jung-gu in Seoul, South Korea.

Economy

All Nippon Airways operates the Seoul Office in Room 1501 on the 15th floor of the Center Building in Sogong-dong. Hainan Airlines operates its South Korea office in Suite 1501 of the Samyoung Building in Sogong-dong.

Attractions
Wongudan
Deoksugung

Transportation 
 Seodaemun Station of

Bukchang-dong

Bukchang-dong is a legal dong with its administrative dong being Sogong-dong (
).

See also 
Administrative divisions of South Korea

References

External links
 Jung-gu Official site in English (Archive:Jung-gu Official site in English)
 Jung-gu Official site
 Jung-gu Tour Guide from the Official site
 Status quo of Jung-gu (Archive:Status quo of Jung-gu)
 Resident offices and maps of Jung-gu  (Archive:Resident offices and maps of Jung-gu)

Neighbourhoods of Jung-gu, Seoul